Ren Jianxin (born August 1925) is a Chinese retired lawyer, judge, and politician. He served as President of the Supreme People's Court from 1988 to 1998.

Early life
Ren Jianxin was born in Xiangfen County, Shanxi Province in 1925. From 1946 to 1948 he studied at Peking University. From 1949 to 1959 he was a clerk in the Communist Party of China's key decision-making bodies: the Central Committee's Political Science and Law Committee, the State Council Bureau of Legislative Affairs and the Office of the State Council.

Career
In 1959 Ren Jianxin became Secretary-General of the Foreign Economic and Trade Arbitration Commission, where he stayed until 1966.
From 1971 to 1981 he was the Director of Legal Affairs in the China Council for the Promotion of International Trade, and Secretary-General in its Maritime Arbitration Commission, before becoming the council's vice-president in 1983. 
In 1983 he entered the Supreme People's Court of China; first started as vice-president for 5 years until 1988, and then President for the next 10 years from 1988 to 1998. It was during this time that he also advanced in the Communist Party of China, and was chosen to become a member of the Secretariat of the CPC Central Committee (1983-1992) and later also its Central Political and Legislative Committee respectively, from 1992 to 1997. In 1995, he signed the Beijing Statement of Principles of the Independence of the Judiciary.

At the age of 72, he moved up to become a Delegate of the National Congress during the Communist Party of China's 15th governing period (1997—2002). 
From 1998 to 2003 he was the vice-chairman of the National Committee's 9th Chinese People's Political Consultative Conference.

Honors and awards
1997—present President of the National Judges College
1997—2003 President of China Law Society

See also
 Cao Jianming- Vice-president of the People's Supreme Court (1999— ) Vice-president, People's Supreme Court
 Wan Exiang - Vice-president of the People's Supreme Court (Grade 2 Judge) (2000— ) and vice-president of the People's Supreme Court

References 

1925 births
Living people
People from Linfen
Presidents of the Supreme People's Court
Members of the Secretariat of the Chinese Communist Party
Vice Chairpersons of the National Committee of the Chinese People's Political Consultative Conference
National University of Peking alumni
20th-century Chinese judges
21st-century Chinese judges